Tabdi is a  village and municipality in Bács-Kiskun county, in the Southern Great Plain region of southern Hungary.

Croats in Hungary call this village Tobdin.

Geography

References 

Populated places in Bács-Kiskun County